The de facto Autonomous Administration of North and East Syria, sometimes referred to as "Rojava", is divided into several self-governing regions. The Afrin, Jazira and Euphrates Regions followed from the cantons established in January 2014 and were envisioned as sub-divisions for a future federalisation of Syria. The three cantons were later reorganized into three regions with subordinate cantons, areas, districts and communes.

In March 2018, most of the Afrin Region was captured by the Turkish Armed Forces (TAF) and Syrian National Army (SNA) in Operation Olive Branch, becoming part of the Turkish occupation of northern Syria. The Afrin Region was reduced to an area around Tell Rifaat. In September 2018, the regions of Raqqa, Tabqa, Manbij and Deir ez-Zor were incorporated into the de facto autonomous region as well. Parts of the Euphrates and Jazira Regions also became occupied by the TAF and SNA after the October 2019 Turkish offensive into north-eastern Syria.

Elections for the local councils of the regions were held in December 2017.

List

Admission of new regions

Article 7 of the Constitution of the de facto autonomous region states:

Notes

References

Kurdistan
Autonomous Administration of North and East Syria